Pennsylvania Route 98 (PA 98) is a state highway located in western Pennsylvania. The southern terminus of the route is at U.S. Route 6 (US 6)/US 19/US 322 in Vernon Township. The northern terminus is at PA 5 in the borough of Avonia,  from Lake Erie.

PA 98 also intersects Interstate 90 (I-90) and US 20 near Fairview.

Route description

PA 98 begins at an roundabout with US 6/US 19/US 322 in Vernon Township, Crawford County, with the road continuing south as part of US 19. From this intersection, the route heads north on two-lane undivided Perry Highway, passing rural areas of homes before heading through farmland and passing to the east of Port Meadville Airport. The road continues through wooded areas of homes, coming to an intersection with PA 102. At this point, PA 98 curves to the northwest and passes through a mix of farms and woods, crossing into Hayfield Township and turning to the north. The road runs through more wooded areas with some farm fields and residences, crossing PA 198 in Littles Corners. The route becomes unnamed and continues through more farmland and woodland with some homes, passing a short distance to the west of Cussewago Creek. PA 98 crosses into Cussewago Township and goes over Carr Run, a tributary to Cussewago Creek, running through more rural areas, eventually turning northeast and crossing Cussewago Creek before passing through Crossingville. The road makes a turn back to the north and passes through more woodland with some farms and homes.

PA 98 enters Elk Creek Township in Erie County and continues due north through agricultural areas with a few woods and homes, intersecting US 6N in Lavery. The road continues through more rural areas with some development, crossing into Franklin Township, where it passes through Franklin Center. The route passes through more open farmland before heading into more wooded areas, becoming Falls Road and heading into Fairview Township. PA 98 becomes Avonia Road and turns to the northwest, passing through a mix of farms and woods with some homes and crossing Elk Creek. The road heads north-northeast and comes to an intersection with the southern terminus of PA 832. Past here, the route runs through rural residential areas and turns northwest, coming to an interchange with I-90, at which point it is a divided highway. PA 98 becomes undivided again and passes through areas of woods and commercial development, heading into a mix of farmland and residential development. The road heads into the residential community of Fairview and crosses US 20 in a commercial area. The route heads through more rural areas of homes, crossing under Norfolk Southern's Lake Erie District railroad line and CSX's Erie West Subdivision railroad line within a short distance of each other. PA 98 comes to its northern terminus at an intersection with PA 5 in Avonia, with Avonia Road continuing north to Lake Erie.

Major intersections

See also

References

External links

Pennsylvania Highways: PA 98

098
Transportation in Crawford County, Pennsylvania
Transportation in Erie County, Pennsylvania